The Ponca Tribal Self-Help Community Building Historic District, with the Ponca Agency Building, was listed on the National Register of Historic Places in 2003.

The  historic district includes two contributing buildings: the Ponca Tribal Self-Help Community building and a caretaker's cottage, both built in 1936. It also includes five contributing structures and one contributing site.

The building construction was funded by the Indian Emergency Conservation Work (IECW) program, sometimes termed the "Indian CCC", less well known than the related Civilian Conservation Corps (CCC) program. The IECW was a program of the Bureau of Indian Affairs.

A Pow Wow circle is in the district.

References

External links

Historic districts on the National Register of Historic Places in Nebraska
Buildings and structures completed in 1936
Buildings and structures in Knox County, Nebraska
Ponca